

The Fokker A.I (Fokker designation M.8) was an "A-class" unarmed two-seat monoplane observation aircraft of the 1914-15 era early in World War I, powered as the earlier Fokker M.5 was, by a 58.8 kW (80 PS) Oberursel U.0 seven cylinder rotary engine, or umlaufmotor, a near-clone of the Gnome Lambda rotary engine of the same power output level — the same U.0 seven cylinder rotary engine version was used on all Fokker military monoplanes before the Fokker E.II Eindecker fighter's debut in 1915-16. The A.I aircraft resembled a substantially enlarged Fokker M.5, with a tall dorsal cabane structure to handle the triple sets of stationary flying and landing wires anchored to the wing panels' forward spar, each panel having fourteen wing ribs, and the similarly triple sets of wing warping cables attached to the rear spar. The A.I and earlier A.IIs were both built by Fokker and license-built by Halberstadt. The origins of the A.I, A.II and A.III were in a Morane-Saulnier Type H purchased from France. This led to the initial Fokker M.5 airframe designed by Martin Kreutzer, from which the larger A.I was derived. Fokker gave many aerobatic demonstrations in the M.5 on the eve of World War I. The M.8, was ordered as the A.I by the Fliegertruppe (Imperial German Army Air Service) and between Fokker and Halberstadt, about 63 were produced.

Specifications
Data from Scott, Josef (2012). Fokker Eindecker Compendium, Volume 1. Berkhampstead, Hertfordshire UK: Albatros Publications, Ltd. p. 18. .

References

Sources

 
 

1910s German military reconnaissance aircraft
A.I
Military aircraft of World War I
High-wing aircraft
Single-engined tractor aircraft
Aircraft first flown in 1915
Rotary-engined aircraft